Have Fun With God is the sixteenth studio album by American folk musician Bill Callahan, released in 2014 by Drag City. The album is a "dub" version of Callahan's previous album, Dream River.

Reception

Have Fun with God received some acclaim from music critics. At Metacritic, which assigns a normalized rating out of 100 to reviews from mainstream critics, the album received an average score of 66 based on 16 reviews, indicating "generally favorable reviews."

Track listing

References

Bill Callahan (musician) albums
2014 remix albums
Drag City (record label) albums
Dub albums